Gulaganjikoppa is a village in Belagavi district in the southern state of Karnataka, India.

Demographics
Per the 2011 Census of India, Gulaganjikoppa has a total population of 1468; 743 of whom are male and 725 female.

References

Villages in Belagavi district